The Mysterious Moon Men of Canada is a Canadian short film, directed by Colin Brunton and released in 1988.

A mockumentary, the film centres on Brownie McFadden (Gerry Quigley), a documentary filmmaker who is trying to track down two guys from Owen Sound, Ontario who flew to the moon in a homemade rocket in 1959 — ten years before the Apollo 11 mission — but were too polite and unassuming, too stereotypically Canadian, to publicly take credit for the achievement.

Accolades
The film won the Genie Award for Best Live Action Short Drama at the 10th Genie Awards.

References

External links
 

1988 films
1988 comedy films
1988 short films
Best Live Action Short Drama Genie and Canadian Screen Award winners
Canadian mockumentary films
1980s English-language films
Canadian comedy short films
1980s Canadian films